Kangri can mean:
of, from, or related to the Kangra Valley or the Kangra district of northern India
Kangri language, the Indo-Aryan language of the valley
Kanger, or kangri, a pot filled with hot embers used by Kashmiris beneath their clothing to keep warm

See also
Kangra (disambiguation)

Language and nationality disambiguation pages